The 2017 Engie Open de Seine-et-Marne was a professional tennis tournament played on indoor hard courts. It was the fifth edition of the tournament and part of the 2017 ITF Women's Circuit, offering a total of $60,000 in prize money. It took place in Croissy-Beaubourg, France, from 27 March–2 April 2017.

Singles main draw entrants

Seeds 

 1 Rankings as of 20 March 2017

Other entrants 
The following players received wildcards into the singles main draw:
  Manon Arcangioli
  Belinda Bencic
  Margot Yerolymos

The following players received entry from the qualifying draw:
  Vera Lapko
  Aleksandrina Naydenova
  Markéta Vondroušová
  Anna Zaja

The following players received entry into the singles main draw by lucky losers:
  Diāna Marcinkēviča
  Tayisiya Morderger
  Yana Morderger

Champions

Singles

 Ekaterina Alexandrova def.  Richèl Hogenkamp, 6–2, 6–7(3–7), 6–3

Doubles

 Vera Lapko /  Polina Monova def.  Manon Arcangioli /  Magdalena Fręch, 6–3, 6–4

External links 
 2017 Engie Open de Seine-et-Marne at ITFtennis.com
 Official website 

2017 in French tennis
2017 ITF Women's Circuit
2017